The 2018–19 Ball State Cardinals women's basketball team will represent Ball State University during the 2018–19 NCAA Division I women's basketball season. The Cardinals, led by seventh year head coach Brady Sallee, play their home games at Worthen Arena as members of the West Division of the Mid-American Conference. They seek to qualify for the NCAA Division I women's basketball tournament for the second time and the first time since 2009 but unfortunately they finished the season 8–23, 3–15 in MAC play to finish in last place in the West Division. They lost in the first of the MAC women's tournament to Toledo.

Roster

Schedule

|-
!colspan=9 style=| Non-conference regular season

|-

|-

|-

|-

|-

|-

|-

|-

|-

|-

|-

|-
!colspan=9 style=| MAC regular season

|-

|-

|-

|-

|-

|-

|-

|-

|-

|-

|-

|-

|-

|-

|-

|-

|-

|-
!colspan=9 style=| MAC Women's Tournament

Rankings
2018–19 NCAA Division I women's basketball rankings

See also
 2018–19 Ball State Cardinals men's basketball team

References

Ball State
Ball State Cardinals women's basketball seasons
Ball State
Ball State